Alan Kevin Kruger (born 16 February 1981) is a South African first-class cricketer and coach.

Kruger played as an all-rounder for Griqualand West and Eagles from 2000 to 2015. His highest score was 221 not out off 265 balls for Griqualand West against North West in 2013–14. His best innings bowling figures were 6 for 37 against Free State in 2005–06. He took his best match bowling figures a week later: 11 for 66 (5 for 20 and 6 for 46) against Easterns.

When his playing career ended, Kruger became a coach. He was the head coach for Knights for two years before being appointed head coach of South Western Districts in August 2020.

References

External links
 

1981 births
Living people
Cricketers from Kimberley, Northern Cape
South African cricketers
Griqualand West cricketers
Knights cricketers
South African cricket coaches